was a district located in Shimane Prefecture, Japan.

As of 2003, the district had an estimated population of 17,618 and a density of 33.44 persons per km2. The total area was 526.92 km2.

Former towns and villages
 Asahi
 Kanagi
 Misumi
 Yasaka

Merger
 On October 1, 2005 - the towns of Asahi, Kanagi, Misumi and Yasaka were merged into the expanded city of Hamada. Naka District was dissolved as a result of this merger.

Former districts of Shimane Prefecture